Alex Huddleston (born August 11, 1986) is an American mixed martial artist currently competing in Bellator's Heavyweight division. A professional competitor since 2011, Huddleston has also formerly competed for Titan FC and Inoki Genome Federation.He is presently a Brazilian Jiu Jitsu Black Belt, and actively competes in the jiu jitsu circuit. He is an instructor at Easton Boulder Colorado.

Mixed martial arts career

Early career
Huddleston began his professional MMA career in July 2011. He compiled a record of four wins and just one loss in his first five bouts, with victories over Daniel Gallemore and Yusuke Kawaguchi, before signing with Bellator.

Bellator MMA
In his Bellator debut, Huddleston faced Derek Bohi at Bellator 130 on October 24, 2014. The pair previously met in an amateur bout at a Titan FC event in 2011, which Huddleston won via first-round knockout. Huddleston would defeat Bohi for a second time, winning via TKO in the first round.

Huddleston next faced fellow up-and-comer Javy Ayala at Bellator 139 on June 26, 2015. Huddleston won via rear-naked choke submission in the first round, moments after dropping Ayala with a left hand.

Huddleston faced Augusto Sakai at Bellator 145 on November 6, 2015. Huddleston knocked Sakai down after connecting with a right hand in the last seconds of the third round, but was unable to finish the fight and lost via unanimous decision.

Mixed martial arts record

|-
|Loss
|align=center|6–2
|Augusto Sakai
|Decision (unanimous)
|Bellator 145
|
|align=center|3
|align=center|5:00
|St. Louis, Missouri, United States
|
|-
|Win
|align=center|6–1
|Javy Ayala
|Submission (rear-naked choke)
|Bellator 139
|
|align=center|1
|align=center|1:12
|Mulvane, Kansas, United States
|
|-
|Win
|align=center|5–1
|Derek Bohi
|TKO (punches)
|Bellator 130
|
|align=center|1
|align=center|4:04
|Mulvane, Kansas, United States
|
|-
|Win
|align=center|4–1
|Yusuke Kawaguchi
|Decision (unanimous)
|IGF: Genome 29
|
|align=center|3
|align=center|5:00
|Tokyo, Japan
|
|-
|Win
|align=center|3–1
|Carl Postma
|TKO (punches)
|Shinzo Fight Sport
|
|align=center|1
|align=center|2:45
|Guatemala City, Guatemala
|
|-
|Win
|align=center|2–1
|Travis Ramirez
|Submission (arm-triangle choke)
|Ultimate Top Team Fights 8
|
|align=center|1
|align=center|1:34
|Colorado Springs, Colorado, United States
|
|-
|Loss
|align=center|1–1
|Justyn Riley
|TKO (punches and elbows)
|Titan FC 20
|
|align=center|2
|align=center|4:39
|Kansas City, Kansas, United States
|
|-
|Win
|align=center|1–0
|Daniel Gallemore
|Decision (unanimous)
|Titan FC 19
|
|align=center|3
|align=center|5:00
|Kansas City, Kansas, United States
|

References

Living people
1986 births
American male mixed martial artists
Heavyweight mixed martial artists